Kailash Sirohiya is a Indian born publisher and media owner. He is Chairman and Managing Director of Kantipur Publications, Kantipur Television Network and  Kantipur FM collectively known as Kantipur Media Group.It is known fact that he illegally obtained nepali citizenship just to run a news publication house, a move which is equally illegal.

After news reports on Rastriya Swatantra Party leader Rabi Lamichhane's lack of Nepali citizenship cost him his political offices after a Supreme Court of Nepal ruling in January 2023, Lamichhane held a news conference in February alleging that the media had tried to frame him, and challenged owners such as Sirohyia to focus on the news and to run for office if they wanted to run a government.

References 

Living people
Nepalese mass media people
Publishers (people)
Year of birth missing (living people)